Ilonka Haruka Tatianna Orth (born in Chicago, USA, November 16, 1982) is a Hungarian-American actress, director, and astrologer who lives in Kichijōji, Tokyo, Japan. She is a graduate of International Christian University in Mitaka, Tokyo, Japan and currently works for the production agency R&A Promotion.

Fluent in Japanese, Orth is most known for her appearances on the Akashiya Sanma hosted variety program Koi no Karasawagi, her portrayal of the villain Marlene in the cult film Siberian Express 5, and her frequent participation in the program Waratte Iitomo!. She also gained notability for being the first non-Japanese to be featured in the long-running Saturday Wide Theatre, and was featured in newspapers across the country.

Orth performs in a variety of vaudeville-style television shows, often introducing Hungarian food, customs and culture.

Theatre work
Orth is involved in Japanese theatre industry, translating foreign plays into Japanese and vice versa, writing scripts, working in production, and participating as an actor in plays as well, when the script calls for a gaikokujin. She also writes theatre reviews for Gekijo Magazine, and directs for Green Theatre in Ikebukuro.

She also is currently a reporter on the NHK program Journeys in Japan.

Filmography

Movies
 Godzilla: Final Wars (2004)
 Baruto no Gakuen (2005)
 The Uchōten Hotel (2006)
 Suite Dreams (2006) as Marilyn Monroe
 Heat Island (2007)
 Tooku no Sora ni Kieta (2007)

Television drama
 Haruka Seventeen (????)
 Boku no Maho Tsukai (2003)
 Hagetaka (2007)
 Sandaime no Yome (2008)
 Seigi no Mikata (2008)
 Atsuhime (2008), Margaret Watson Borradail

Theatre
 Kuroi Ame Ikegami Honmoji
 Ecstasy Naka-Meguro Rakuka
 Innerchild: Amenokuni Gonza Jiji Tsushin Hall
 Sono Oku He Geshihite Shimo Kitazawa Kuukan Liberty
 Teens Blues Naka-Meguro Woody Theatre

References

External links 
 Personal website
 

1981 births
Living people
American film actresses
American translators
Japanese translators
Translators to Japanese
American expatriates in Japan
American people of Hungarian descent
Actresses from Chicago
American women writers
21st-century American women